Kilfane is a combination of two townlands located outside of Thomastown in County Kilkenny, Ireland. Located in the barony of Gowran, Kilfane gives its name to the wider civil parish which contains 16 townlands. It is in the Roman Catholic parish of Tullaherin.

This is also the site of the 13th-century Kilfane Church, now in ruins, which has an adjoining castellated presbytery or stone house. There are traces of the original consecration crosses to be seen, the ogee headed doorways, remains of the altar, sedilia and book rest. Inside the ruined church on the North Wall is the effigy of a Norman Knight in full armour. It is referred to as Cantwell Fada and this effigy is the tallest of its kind in Britain or Ireland.

Kilfane House was the seat of the Power family who were responsible for the creation of  Kilfane Glen and Waterfall which is now a tourist attraction containing a romantic era (Romanticism) garden and waterfall 

There is also a Gaelic Handball alley constructed in Kilfane quarry in the 1920s

References

Footnotes

Sources

External links
 Kilfane Glen and Waterfall
 Tullaherin Heritage Society
 Discover Ireland

Gardens in County Kilkenny
Waterfalls of the Republic of Ireland